Advanced Placement (AP) United States History (also known as AP U.S. History or APUSH is a college-level course and examination offered by College Board as part of the Advanced Placement Program.

Course

The AP U.S. History course is designed to provide the same level of content and instruction that students would face in a freshman-level college survey class. 

The course covers 9 periods of US History, spanning from the pre-Columbian era to the present day. The percentage indicates the exam weighting of each content area:

AP U.S. History classes generally use a college-level textbook as the foundation for the course.

Textbooks
Commonly used textbooks that meet the curriculum requirements include:

America's History (Henretta et al.)
American History: A Survey (Brinkley)
American Passages (Ayers et al.)
The American Pageant (Bailey et al.)
The American People (Nash et al.)
By the People (Fraser)
The Enduring Vision (Boyer et al.)
Give Me Liberty! (Foner)
Liberty, Equality, Power (Murrin et al.)
Out of Many (Faragher et al.)
A People and a Nation (Norton et al.)

Conservative criticism
American conservatives have criticized the course framework for downplaying American exceptionalism and failing to foster patriotism.  In 2015, a bill to replace the course framework was passed by the Oklahoma House of Representatives’ Education Committee, but later withdrawn.  The course framework was revised in 2015 in response to the criticism. In 2014, student protests in Colorado were held over plans by the Jefferson County Public Schools district board to revise the AP US History curriculum to emphasize citizenship, patriotism, and respect for authority.

Exam
The AP U.S. History exam lasts 3 hours and 15 minutes and consists of two sections, and Section I is divided into two parts.  Section I, part A includes 55 multiple choice questions with each question containing four choices. The multiple choice questions cover American History from just before European contact with Native Americans to the present day. Questions are presented in sets of two to five questions organized around a primary source or an image (including, but not limited to, maps and political cartoons). Section I, part B includes three short-answer questions. The first two questions are required, but students choose between the third and fourth questions. In total, students are given 95 minutes (55 for the multiple choice section and 40 for three short-answer questions) to complete section I.

Section II of the exam is the free-response section, in which examinees write two essays. Section II, part A, is a document-based question (DBQ), which provides an essay prompt and seven short primary sources or excerpts related to the prompt. Students are expected to write an essay responding to the prompt in which they utilize the sources in addition to outside information. Section II, part B, provides three thematic essay prompts. Students must respond to only one of the three essay prompts. (In 2020, due to the COVID-19 pandemic in the United States, the AP exams were administered remotely as drastically shortened open-note exams. The AP US History exam consisted of a single modified DBQ essay.)

Each long essay question on the AP exam may address any one of three possible historical reasoning processes: patterns of continuity and change, comparison, or causation. Each of the essay questions will address the same historical reasoning process. There is a fifteen-minute reading period for students to read the essay prompts, take notes, and brainstorm, but students may begin to write the essays before this period ends. Students will then have 100 minutes to write the two essays; 60 minutes are recommended for the DBQ and 40 minutes for the long essay, but students are free to work on the two essays as they see fit.

In May 2011, the AP U.S. History Test was taken by 402,947 students worldwide, making it second in terms of number of examinees, behind the AP English Language and Composition exam.

Scoring
Section I is worth 60% of the total AP exam score, with 40% of the total exam score derived from the student's performance on the multiple choice section and 20% of the total exam score derived from the student's performance on the short answer questions. The remaining 40% of the total exam score is derived from section II; the document-based question is worth 25% of the total exam score, while the long essay question is worth 15% of the total exam score.

The score distributions since 2007 were:

Composite score range
The College Board has released information on the composite score range (out of 180) required to obtain each grade:

Note: The above composite score cut points reflect the pre-2011 grading formula which deducted 0.25 points for every incorrect multiple choice answer.

References

External links
AP United States History on CollegeBoard.com

Advanced Placement
History education
History of the United States